Recorded Future is a privately held cybersecurity company founded in 2009, with headquarters in Somerville, Massachusetts. 

The company specializes in the collection, processing, analysis, and dissemination of threat intelligence. Recorded Future uses patented machine learning and natural language processing methods to continuously collect and organize data from open web, dark web, and technical sources. 

The resulting information is displayed within a software-as-a-service portal.

History
In 2007, co-founders Christopher Ahlberg and Staffan Truvé, both Ph.D.s in computer science from Chalmers University of Technology, filed for Recorded Future's first patent (granted in 2013 as United States patent US8468153B2) – Data Analysis System with Automated Query and Visualization Environment Setup. The patent was used for continuous collection and processing of data and information from sources across the open, deep, and dark web, facilitated by machine learning. Recorded Future was officially incorporated in 2009.

The company received initial funding from Google and In-Q-Tel, which was reported in a July 2010 introduction to Recorded Future published by Wired.

When it decided that its algorithms and visualization software matched needs within the intelligence community, Recorded Future entered the cyber threat intelligence market in January 2012.

In 2014, the company launched Recorded Future Dark Web, integrating open and dark web sourcing as well as dark web forum access and analysis.

In 2016, Recorded Future was named a partner for threat intelligence by Splunk, Palo Alto Networks, and Vencore GEOINT.

In May 2017, Recorded Future introduced Insikt Group, the company's threat intelligence research arm. The word "insikt" is Swedish, a nod to Recorded Future's co-founders, and means "insight." Insikt Group is responsible for delivering analyst-generated assessments, insights, and recommended actions to customers and the public.

In May 2019, New York-based private equity firm Insight Partners acquired Recorded Future for $780 million.

In November 2019, the company opened a second office in Somerville with the goal of building a "campus" in the Davis Square area. Recorded Future currently employs more than 430 people around the world.

In 2020, the company announced the establishment of The Record by Recorded Future, a cybersecurity focused news outlet.

Products

Recorded Future's product is called the Recorded Future Intelligence Cloud.

Using what they call a "Temporal Analytics Engine," Recorded Future provides forecasting and analysis tools to help analysts predict future events by scanning sources on the internet, and extracting, measuring, and visualizing the information to show networks and patterns in the past, present, and future. , the engine was described as "Web Intelligence Engine." Likewise, the Washington Post, in an article authored by Stewart Baker, the former General Counsel of the National Security Agency (1992–1994), which had described the company as a predictive analytics web intelligence firm deleted the term upon request of RF. The software analyzes sources and forms "invisible links" between documents to find links that tie them together and may possibly indicate the entities and events involved. 

Clients initially included the financial sector with quantitative investors, but since 2013, they have changed to businesses seeking cyber security, per Ahlberg, for example SITA (IT company), a global air transport IT company.

Organization
The company was founded in 2009 by Christopher Ahlberg and had 20 employees as of November 2011. Google Ventures and In-Q-Tel invested "under $10 million each" into the Recorded Future shortly after the company was founded. Google published this on May 3, 2010 In-Q-Tel is an investment arm of the CIA. , it had partnerships with IBM, HP ArcSight, Cimation, Ethnographic Edge, Tiberium Security, and Malformity Labs LLC per its company profile published by Businessweek.

Analysis

Red Echo Report
In 2021, Recorded Future's Insikt Group identified the China-linked group RedEcho, which targeted 10 distinct Indian organizations in the power generation and transmission sector and two organizations in the maritime sector.

China Vulnerability Database Report
In November 2017, Recorded Future published analysis asserting that the Ministry of State Security (China) influences or alters their National Vulnerability Database (CNNVD) to coverup espionage activities. According to the analysis, "vulnerabilities commonly exploited by malware linked to Chinese APT groups" are incompatible with CNNVD publication practices. The company presented further analysis in March 2018, at the Kaspersky Labs Analyst Summit, presenting evidence that the Chinese government retroactively changed the original publication dates.

Al-Qaeda report
In May 2014, Recorded Future released a report called "How Al-Qaeda Uses Encryption Post-Snowden (Part 1)." Part 2 of the report was released on August 1, 2014, supposedly with a strengthened "earlier hypothesis about Snowden leaks influencing Al-Qaeda’s crypto product innovation." On the same day National Public Radio aired Recorded Future claims of "tangible evidence" that Edward Snowden harmed national security by prompting terrorists to develop more sophisticated encryption programs. Glenn Greenwald and Andrew Fishman criticized Recorded Future's report did not prove causation between Snowden's leak and improved encryption by al-Qaeda.

Occupy Wall Street Media Monitoring Report
In 2011, Recorded Future reported "gaining online momentum for the Occupy Wall Street movement. When we look more carefully at influencers in this discussion using our Influencer Map, we find that Iran Press TV is the second largest influencer after the U.S. media!"

China Lockdown Protests Report
In December 2022, Recorded Future released a report detailing a network of bot account on social media that disseminated spam and irrelevant comments under legitimate posts about the 2022 protests in China, including posts with hashtags that contained the names of Chinese cities. The report suggests that the Chinese government is the most likely source of the spam attack. The bots used pornography or randomized word strings to divert discussions of protests, targeting Mandarin speakers on a variety of social media platforms.

Controversies
In April 2015, a coding website accused Recorded Future of violating internet privacy by analyzing private Facebook messages, which it denied. The accusation was disproven when the assumed private link for private Facebook chat was found posted publicly online via a server log.

See also
 Open-source intelligence
 Corporate security
 Managed security service
 Operational intelligence
 Palantir Technologies
 Intelligence engine

References

External links
 Official Website
 Official Twitter Handle

Prediction
Analytics companies
Companies based in Middlesex County, Massachusetts
Software companies based in Massachusetts
Software companies established in 2009
Software companies of Sweden
GV companies
Data brokers
2019 mergers and acquisitions
Somerville, Massachusetts
Software companies of the United States